Mehrzad is a Persian male and female given name popular in Iran. Mehr (مهر) means "sun" and Zād (زاد) means "born of". So the literal meaning of Mehrzād (مهرزاد) is born of sun.

Mehrzad is the forename of:

 Mehrzad Marashi (born 1980), Iranian-German singer 
 Mehrzad Madanchi (born 1985), Iranian football midfielder  

Given names

de:Mehrzad